Claus Peter Poppe (born 1 March 1948) is a German politician, representative of the Social Democratic Party.

Politics
Since 1975, Poppe has been a member of the SPD.  From 1976 to 1996 he was a councillor of the city of Lohne, most recently as chairman of the SPD parliamentary group in the city.  From 1986 to 1996 he was elected to represent Vechta District.

Poppe was elected to the Lower Saxony Landtag in 2003 (the 15th Legislature of Lower Saxony). He was re-elected into MdL office in 2008 and 2013. Since 2008 Poppe has also been a member of the Working Group "Integration" of the SPD-Land Group, member of the "Gesprächskreis SPD and Churches" and the Rolf-Dieter-Brinkmann-Gesellschaft. He is president of the TSV Quakenbrück (with the Artland Dragons).

He served as the honorary mayor of Quakenbrück from 2011 to 2014. 2014 he won the mayoral elections of the Artland municipality (which includes Quakenbrück) and subsequently resigned from his parliament office that year. He served as mayor of Artland since, but due to his age didn't run again for office in 2021.

See also
List of Social Democratic Party of Germany politicians

References

External links

Official site

Living people
People from Quakenbrück
Members of the Landtag of Lower Saxony
Social Democratic Party of Germany politicians
1948 births
People from Vechta (district)
Mayors of places in Germany